Pirates of the Caribbean Multiplayer Mobile is a massively multiplayer mobile game based on the series of films and the Disney theme park attraction of the same name.

Gameplay
The game features several game modes in which players must achieve a variety of objectives, such as defeating the enemy team in battle, stealing the enemy fleet's flag and bringing it back to their own harbor, or being tasked with defending a port from an attacking enemy team who is tasked with plundering it.

Reception
The game received a positive review from IGN who rated it 7.8 from 10.

References

External links
 Disney Official Pirates of the Caribbean Multiplayer Mobile website

2006 video games
Massively multiplayer online games
Mobile games
Naval video games
Multiplayer Mobile
Video games developed in the United States